The Order of the Phoenix is a secret organisation in the Harry Potter series of fiction books written by J. K. Rowling. Founded by Albus Dumbledore to fight Lord Voldemort and his followers, the Death Eaters, the Order lends its name to the fifth book of the series, Harry Potter and the Order of the Phoenix.

Synopsis 
Before the Harry Potter chronology starts – when the character Lord Voldemort declared war on the Wizarding World – Albus Dumbledore, headmaster of Hogwarts School of Witchcraft and Wizardry and an upstanding and powerful citizen of the Wizarding World, attempted to take control of the situation by founding the Order of the Phoenix. Several characters joined the organisation, seeking to prevent Voldemort from taking over the Wizarding World and establishing a tyrannical new world order. During this period, before the events of the Harry Potter and the Philosopher's Stone, the Order sustained heavy losses, including the murders of minor characters such as the Prewetts, the Bones and the McKinnons. The Longbottoms were also tortured to insanity at the hands of Bellatrix Lestrange.

Voldemort's first reign of terror ended after the murders of James and Lily Potter, and the unsuccessful attempt to murder their son, Harry Potter, at the beginning of the series. The spell rebounded on to him and severely diminished Voldemort's powers and as a result the Order was temporarily disbanded due to the lack of any further threat.

When Harry reported that Voldemort had returned, towards the end of Harry Potter and the Goblet of Fire, Dumbledore reactivated the Order. Many of the original members returned and were soon joined by recruits who effectively replaced those who had died in service during the first conflict. The Order established their headquarters at Number Twelve, Grimmauld Place, Sirius Black's family home, during the interval between the fourth and fifth books in the series. Dumbledore was the Secret-Keeper for the Order, meaning that only he could reveal the location of the Order's headquarters to others. Dumbledore's death in book six made the location vulnerable and it was abandoned in favour of The Burrow as a result.

The Order led the fight against Voldemort in the fifth instalment while the Minister for Magic refused to accept the return of Voldemort. In Harry Potter and the Order of the Phoenix, some Order members take turns guarding Sybill Trelawney's prophecy, which referred to Voldemort's downfall and Harry's role in defeating him. Rubeus Hagrid, the Hogwarts Grounds Keeper and an original Member of the Order, was accompanied by Olympe Maxime in an attempt to recruit the giants to the Order's cause. Some members also participated in a battle at the Department of Mysteries near the end of the fifth book. Order members patrolled Hogwarts, the Wizarding school, on the night of Dumbledore's death in Half-Blood Prince, fighting the Death Eaters who managed to enter the castle.

In the series finale, attention turns to escorting the Death Eaters' main target, Harry Potter, from his summer home with the Dursleys to the Weasleys' Burrow. Later in the novel, after Voldemort's takeover of the Ministry had succeeded, some Order members hosted "Potterwatch", a secret pirate radio programme providing news on the Wizarding World that Voldemort's regime did not want the general population to know. During the climax of the book, most of the Order, aided by Dumbledore's Army, the Hogwarts staff and the older students, Slytherin house members included, fought against the Death Eaters in the Battle of Hogwarts, in which several Order members and other allies lost their lives.

Members of the Order

Original
The following characters were members of the Order of the Phoenix during Lord Voldemort's initial rise to power and several years prior to the main events of the Harry Potter series. Many of these characters later served as members of the revived Order.

Members of the reconstituted Order
These new members joined the Order when Dumbledore reactivated it after Lord Voldemort's return at the end of Harry Potter and the Goblet of Fire.

Order members
This is a list of notable members of the Order of the Phoenix. Albus Dumbledore, Severus Snape,  Minerva McGonagall, Rubeus Hagrid, Sirius Black, Remus Lupin, and Fred and George Weasley have their own pages, and Peter Pettigrew is listed under Death Eater.

Fleur Delacour
Fleur Isabelle Delacour is a student of Beauxbatons Academy in France, and is selected as a champion in the prestigious Triwizard Tournament. Her maternal grandmother is a Veela, from whom Fleur inherited her silvery-blonde hair, pale eyes, good looks, and ability to enchant men. It is revealed in the Tournament wand inspection that the core of Fleur's wand is a Veela hair from her grandmother.

During the Triwizard Tournament, Fleur is initially aloof and unfriendly despite receiving much admiration from the boys, especially Ron. During the second task of the Tournament, she attempts to rescue her sister Gabrielle Delacour from the lake but fails, hindered by the Grindylows. When Harry rescues Gabrielle instead, Fleur is extremely grateful, despite her sister being in no real danger, and becomes much warmer towards both Harry and Hogwarts. Fleur finishes in 4th place in the Triwizard Tournament due to being Stunned during the last task.

In the following year, Fleur works at Gringotts with Bill Weasley, whom she already met during the Tournament, and the pair become engaged. Bill is attacked and permanently scarred by werewolf Fenrir Greyback and severely mauled near the end of Harry Potter and the Half-Blood Prince in the Battle of the Astronomy Tower. However, since Greyback is in his human form at the time of the attack, Bill suffers only partial lycanthropic contamination. Molly Weasley, who largely disapproves of Fleur, assumes that she will no longer wish to marry Bill, but Fleur is adamant that their wedding plans go unchanged and proudly declares Bill's wounds to be a sign of bravery, adding, "I am good looking enough for the both of us anyway". Her fierce, loving loyalty to her fiancé earns her much respect from most of Bill's erstwhile disapproving family, especially Molly, who is finally forced to admit that their love is genuine.

In Harry Potter and the Deathly Hallows, Fleur and Bill take part in the operation to escort Harry safely to the Burrow, and they witness Mad-Eye Moody being killed by Voldemort. The couple has their wedding and reception at the Burrow, but the event is interrupted when Death Eaters attack after the fall of the Ministry of Magic. 

They begin married life in a house on a beach in Wales called Shell Cottage. Fleur and Bill allow Ron to stay with them after he walks out on Harry and Hermione during their hunt for Horcruxes. The newlyweds later provide a safe haven for the trio and others rescued from Malfoy Manor at Shell Cottage. Both Bill and Fleur are combatants for the Order during the Battle of Hogwarts and manage to survive it. The couple go on to have three children: Victoire, Dominique and Louis.

French actress and model Clémence Poésy portrays Fleur in the film adaptation of Harry Potter and the Goblet of Fire and both parts of the Harry Potter and the Deathly Hallows film adaptation.

Aberforth Dumbledore
Aberforth Dumbledore is Albus Dumbledore's brother. He is his younger brother by some three years and the less skilled of the two; as such, he is usually left in the background while his brother basks in the glory of his comparative success. His first appearance is in the book Harry Potter and the Goblet of Fire. After his parents' deaths and Albus' return home to look after their unstable sister Ariana, Aberforth quarrels with his brother and his brother's friend, Gellert Grindelwald, over their plans to start a new order, neglecting Ariana. Grindelwald began torturing him, leading to the three dueling. This argument results in Ariana's accidental death at the hands of one of them. At Ariana's funeral, Aberforth publicly confronts Albus and strikes him, breaking his nose. Eventually, Aberforth becomes the owner and barman of the Hog's Head inn. He is known for his strong affinity with goats. His Patronus takes the form of a goat, and he recounts to the trio that as a boy he fed the goats in company with his sister, Ariana. Aberforth was also tried before the Wizengamot (the Wizard High Court), for performing inappropriate charms on a goat. His tavern also, according to Harry's description in Harry Potter and the Order of the Phoenix, has a faint smell of goats. In the film adaptation, a bleating goat can be seen shuffling about in the back of the pub.

It is not until Deathly Hallows that Aberforth plays an important role in the series by taking Harry, Ron, and Hermione into his bar before the Death Eaters can capture them. Aberforth later reveals to the trio some facts they did not know about the history of the Dumbledore family. While being held prisoner in Malfoy Manor, Harry briefly glimpses Aberforth's eye in the remaining shard of the two-way mirror he was given by Sirius and calls for Aberforth's help. Aberforth bought its counterpart from Mundungus Fletcher. Using the mirror to watch over the trio, Aberforth sends Dobby to rescue them and the other prisoners from the Manor. He liked Dobby and was upset to hear Bellatrix Lestrange killed him.

Aberforth allows the resistance fighters to use a secure passageway from the Hog's Head to the Room of Requirement through Ariana's portrait, it being the only unguarded entrance into Hogwarts. This passage is used to evacuate underage students from Hogwarts and, according to Neville, it was also used by members of Dumbledore's Army to get food when they were living in the Room of Requirement because that is one thing the Room of Requirement would not do. Aberforth leaves the Order, believing the war against Voldemort is lost. However, he quickly joins the Battle of Hogwarts and is last seen Stunning Augustus Rookwood. According to Rowling, Aberforth survives the battle, and is still "at the Hog's Head, playing with his goats".

Jim McManus appeared briefly as Aberforth in the film adaptation of Harry Potter and the Order of the Phoenix. Ciarán Hinds plays Aberforth in a larger role in Harry Potter and the Deathly Hallows – Part 2. Richard Coyle plays the middle-aged version of the character in the third Fantastic Beasts film, Fantastic Beasts: The Secrets of Dumbledore.

Arabella Figg
Arabella Doreen Figg, better known simply as Mrs. Figg, is a Squib living undercover as a Muggle and on Dumbledore's orders surreptitiously watches over Harry while he is at home with the Dursleys. She is a Chekhov gun, first mentioned as a seemingly insignificant neighbour in Harry Potter and the Philosopher's Stone and not revealed as a member of the magical community until Order of the Phoenix. She has a lifelong love of cats and does "a roaring trade" in crossbred cats and Kneazles, their magical variant. Within the Order of the Phoenix, she functions as one of Dumbledore's liaisons between the magical and Muggle worlds. In Order of the Phoenix, she aids Harry after he and his cousin Dudley Dursley are attacked by two Dementors, and chooses to reveal herself to him. She explains to Harry that she deliberately made Harry's stays with her unpleasant so that the Dursleys would continue to send him to her, though she would have preferred to do otherwise. When the Ministry of Magic tries to have Harry expelled from Hogwarts for underage use of magic (after he cast a Patronus charm to protect himself and his cousin), her testimony before the Wizengamot is crucial in allowing Harry to stay at Hogwarts. However, according to Rowling, Squibs are incapable of seeing Dementors, and it is suggested by her manner during the trial that she has been prompted what to say with regard to the Dementors. In Harry Potter and the Half-Blood Prince, she attends Dumbledore's funeral at Hogwarts.

Mrs. Figg was portrayed by Kathryn Hunter in the film adaptation of Order of the Phoenix.

Mundungus Fletcher
Mundungus "Dung" Fletcher is mentioned in passing in some of the earlier books in the series, but it is not until the second chapter of Harry Potter and the Order of the Phoenix that he makes his first appearance. Mundungus is described as a "squat, unshaven man" with "short, bandy legs", "long, straggly ginger hair", and "bloodshot, baggy eyes that gave him the doleful look of a basset hound". He is involved in many illegal activities, yet he seems confined to relatively minor crimes, such as theft and trading stolen goods on the black market. Many members of the Order have mixed feelings about him, but he is very loyal to Dumbledore, who once got him out of serious trouble. His connections enable him to hear rumours and information rolling around the shadier segments of the Wizarding population, which could potentially prove instrumental in the fight against Voldemort.

He is briefly mentioned in Harry Potter and the Goblet of Fire where following the Death Eaters attack at the Quidditch World Cup, Mundungus put in an insurance claim to the Ministry of Magic for a twelve-bedroomed tent with an en-suite jacuzzi, while in reality, he had been sleeping under a cloak propped on sticks. As a member of both the original and the newly reformed Order of the Phoenix, he is assigned guard duty to protect Harry, but abandons his position to conduct a shady cauldron-trading deal, leaving a critical opening through which Dementors manage to attack Harry. In Harry Potter and the Half-Blood Prince, Harry catches Mundungus outside the Three Broomsticks trying to sell what had been Sirius' property (which now belongs to Harry after Sirius' death) to Aberforth, and the boy confronts him. Mundungus goes into hiding but is later jailed in Azkaban for impersonating an Inferius during a botched robbery.

In Harry Potter and the Deathly Hallows, Mundungus has managed to get out of prison, but the circumstances are unclear. He is Confunded by Snape, and gives the idea of using the Polyjuice Potion and six Potter decoys to the Order and helps with the escort of Harry from Privet Drive. He travels with Mad-Eye Moody on a broomstick as one of the Potter decoys. During the flight from Privet Drive, he flees when Voldemort himself shows up. It is later revealed by Kreacher that, included in the property he stole from 12 Grimmauld Place in the previous book was a heavy locket from the drawing room. That locket was the Slytherin's locket Horcrux. Then Kreacher is sent by Harry to capture Mundungus, who reveals that Umbridge took the locket from him under threat of arrest.

Andy Linden plays Mundungus Fletcher in Harry Potter and the Deathly Hallows – Part 1.

Alastor "Mad-Eye" Moody 
Alastor "Mad-Eye" Moody is perhaps the most famous Auror in the modern times of the Wizarding World, single-handedly responsible for capturing numerous wizard criminals. He is also said never to have killed his quarry, even when permitted to do so, unless he had no other choice. Moody's face is badly scarred; he has lost several body parts while fighting Dark wizards, including his left eye, lower left leg, and part of his nose; and he is cautious – some characters might say paranoid – in that he refuses to eat or drink anything which he himself did not prepare. He has replaced his missing eye with a magical one that can rotate 360 degrees and see through almost everything (including walls, doors, Invisibility Cloaks, and the back of his own head). He walks with a pronounced limp due to his prosthetic leg and uses a walking staff. He frequently exclaims "Constant vigilance!" to encourage wizards to be on their guard against the dark arts, and keeps a number of devices in his office to alert him to the presence of potential enemies. Before his retirement from the Aurors' Office, he was Nymphadora Tonks' mentor, and still regards her as his protégée.

In Harry Potter and the Goblet of Fire, Moody is appointed as the new Defence Against the Dark Arts teacher at Hogwarts, coming out of retirement as a favour to Dumbledore. Shortly before the school year begins, however, Moody is attacked by Barty Crouch, Jr., who subdues him with the Imperius Curse and takes Polyjuice Potion to assume his appearance. He keeps the real Moody alive as a source both of Polyjuice potion ingredients and of personal information helpful in putting the impersonation over and takes Moody's place at Hogwarts. Moody's well-known habit of carrying around his own drinks in a private hip flask allows Crouch to take the Polyjuice Potion as needed to sustain the masquerade without raising suspicion.

Crouch/Moody becomes noted for teaching and demonstrating normally higher-level topics to Harry's fourth-year class (such as the Unforgivable Curses). He is a demanding teacher who expects students to work. He puts up with very little, for example punishing Draco Malfoy by transforming him into a ferret to stick up for Harry when Malfoy was tormenting him.

After Harry unexpectedly returns alive from the graveyard battle with Voldemort, Crouch/Moody takes Harry back to his office, questions him about Voldemort and what happened in the graveyard, and reveals that he is working for Voldemort. He then prepares to kill Harry, but Dumbledore, McGonagall, and Snape stop him. Having neglected to take his hourly dose of Polyjuice potion, Crouch transforms back to his own appearance and, under the influence of Veritaserum, confesses everything. Dumbledore then rescues the real Moody from his magic trunk.

In Harry Potter and the Order of the Phoenix, the real Moody has joined the newly re-formed Order and leads the party transferring Harry from 4 Privet Drive to Number 12 Grimmauld Place. He appears at the climax of that book, arriving at the battle at the Department of Mysteries after being tipped off by Snape. He also appears with Lupin and Tonks at the very end, when they give the Dursleys a warning concerning their treatment of Harry. Moody only features briefly in Half-Blood Prince. In Deathly Hallows he is killed by Voldemort after being abandoned by Mundungus Fletcher, who was acting as a Potter decoy. The Order is unable to recover his body, but later his magical eye is found by Harry mounted on Dolores Umbridge's office door to spy on Ministry of Magic employees. Harry retrieves the eye, disgusted that it would be used in such a way, and buries it at the base of an old tree in Mad-Eye's memory.

Moody is portrayed by Brendan Gleeson in the film series.

James Potter

James Potter, nicknamed Prongs, is the father of Harry Potter and husband of Lily Potter (née Evans). James met Sirius Black, Remus Lupin, and Peter Pettigrew when they entered Hogwarts. When James, Sirius, and Peter discovered that Remus is, in fact, a werewolf, the three of them illegally learned to become Animagi to accompany Remus safely during his transformations and keep him under control. It is during this time that they discovered almost all the secret passageways of Hogwarts and designed the Marauder's Map.  At school, James is said to have been a talented player on the Gryffindor Quidditch team. In the film version of Philosopher's Stone, Harry and his friends find James' name listed on a plaque as a Seeker on his Quidditch team; however, Rowling stated in an interview that she intended him to be a Chaser.

Rowling describes James and Harry as having similar attributes: the same thin face, the same hands, the same untidy black hair sticking up at the back, and about the same height at school age. However, Rowling also describes James as having hazel eyes and a slightly longer nose than Harry does. Like Harry, James is generally described to be a good, loyal friend who "regarded it as the height of dishonour to mistrust his friends". Characters in the books sometimes comment negatively on James' personality, about which Rowling comments that "there was a lot of good in James". The Hogwarts student population seems to have admired James back in his day, and teachers respected his talent, though not his behaviour; he was quite the prankster along with his fellow marauders.

His popularity, however, was not universal, as a mutual hatred sprang up between him and Snape. Snape constantly tells Harry that James was "exceedingly arrogant", and on one occasion, Sirius admits that he and James could sometimes be "arrogant little berks" but that "James grew out of it" (which Lily is said to have noted by their seventh year). He became Head Boy in his seventh year along with Lily as Head Girl.

In Harry Potter and the Order of the Phoenix, after seeing a scene from Snape's memories within a Pensieve of a fifteen-year-old James and Sirius bullying Snape, Harry agrees with Snape's assessment of his father's arrogance. According to Dumbledore in Harry Potter and the Philosopher's Stone, however, James and Snape shared a rivalry, not unlike that of Draco and Harry. In addition, Lupin tells Harry that Snape "never lost an opportunity to curse James". According to an interview with Rowling, "James always suspected Snape harboured deeper feelings for Lily, which was a factor in James' behaviour to Snape." However, when Sirius attempts to lure Snape into the Shrieking Shack where Lupin stays during his werewolf transformations, James prevents him from entering the tunnel under the Whomping Willow, thus saving Snape's life; although – as Snape points out – this also saved James from expulsion.

After graduating from Hogwarts, James – along with Lily and his friends – become "full-time fighters" for the Order, and do not hold regular jobs, supporting his family and Lupin, whose status as a werewolf made him unemployable, on family gold. In an interview, Rowling revealed that James and Lily were asked by Voldemort to join the Death Eaters, but refused, making it "one strike against them before they were even out of their teens". When his son Harry becomes Voldemort's target, the Potters go into hiding and name Pettigrew as their secret keeper. However, on 31 October 1981, the Potters' whereabouts are betrayed by Pettigrew, and they are attacked by Voldemort without warning at their home in Godric's Hollow. James urges his wife to take Harry and run while he holds Voldemort off. Wandless, he is killed.

He briefly appears in Harry Potter and the Goblet of Fire as a result of Priori Incantatem, when Harry's wand and Voldemort's meet, showing the most recent spells cast by each – in the case of Voldemort's wand, the most recent lives taken. He makes a final appearance at the end of Harry Potter and the Deathly Hallows through the use of the Resurrection Stone.

James and Sirius are the heroes of the Harry Potter prequel, an 800-word story set three years before Harry's birth. The two friends are riding Sirius' motorbike and are chased by two Muggle policemen for breaking the speed limit. The policemen attempt to arrest them when three Death Eaters on broomsticks fly down towards them. James and Sirius use the police car as a barrier and the Death Eaters crash into it. In the end, they escape from the policemen by flying away on the motorbike.

In the film series, James is portrayed by Adrian Rawlins as an adult, Robbie Jarvis as a teenager and Alfie McIlwain as a child.

Lily Potter 

Lily J. Potter (née Evans) is the mother of Harry Potter. She is described as being very pretty, with startlingly green almond-shaped eyes and thick, long, dark auburn hair. She is one of the "all-time favorite students" of star collector Horace Slughorn, who describes her as "vivacious", "charming", "cheeky", and "very funny" and recalls that he "often told her she should have been in Slytherin". In addition, Slughorn says Lily is one of the brightest students he ever taught, with a natural and intuitive ability at Potions. Rowling describes Lily as being "a bit of a catch"; she was a popular girl for whom many boys had romantic feelings. Although Lily is Muggle-born, she is an extremely gifted witch at the top of her class. She became Head Girl in her seventh year. Lily's sister Petunia Dursley despised her for being a witch and viewed her as a "freak", although Petunia is later revealed to have been envious of her abilities. Rowling stated that Lily did receive warning letters for testing the limits of the Statute of Secrecy. Lily's Patronus is a doe, presumably to pair with James' Animagus shape of a stag (also the form of Harry's Patronus).

After witnessing a memory from Snape about Lily's and James' time as Hogwarts students, Harry gathers the impression that Lily hated James, but Sirius and Lupin assure him that she did not; they "simply got off on the wrong foot", because Snape and James hated each other, and Snape was Lily's best friend at the time, despite him sorting into Slytherin. Rowling confirmed this view when asked how Lily and James had fallen in love if Lily hated him. Lupin tells Harry that after James matured, Lily started seeing him in their seventh year. Rowling later echoed Lupin's words, describing it as James having to "[tone] down some of his more 'bombastic' behavior". They married soon after leaving Hogwarts, with Sirius as best man at their wedding.

The old, pre-Hogwarts friendship between Lily and Snape is fully revealed in Harry Potter and the Deathly Hallows, along with the fact that Snape harboured unrequited romantic feelings for Lily from childhood. Rowling states that while Lily loved Snape as a friend, she might have returned those romantic feelings if Snape had not become so seriously involved in the Dark Arts. Their relationship ends in their fifth year at Hogwarts, when Snape, in his anger and humiliation at being jinxed by James and Sirius, unthinkingly calls Lily a "Mudblood" after she defended him.

After leaving Hogwarts, Snape becomes a Death Eater and informs Voldemort of half of an overheard prophecy, which Voldemort takes to refer to Lily and her son, Harry. Fearing for Lily's life, Snape joins the Order as a spy for Dumbledore, in exchange for what he hopes will be Dumbledore's protection of Lily. Voldemort offers Lily the chance to step aside before he kills Harry because of Snape's request to spare Lily's life, but Lily refuses and Voldemort kills her. The result of her selfless act of love manifests itself two ways: when Voldemort attempted to kill Harry with the Killing Curse the spell backfired, rendering Voldemort non-corporeal. The lingering protection afforded to Harry by Lily's sacrifice rendered Voldemort unable to touch him physically. The second way in which Harry is protected by Lily's sacrifice occurs when Petunia takes Harry in. Dumbledore tells Harry that Lily's protection was extended to Privet Drive because Lily and Petunia are related by blood. This protection ends when Harry comes of age at 17.

Though Harry bears a great resemblance to his father, it is often noted that he has Lily's eyes. Dumbledore has said that Harry's deepest nature is much more similar to his mother's. In a 1999 interview, Rowling stated that "he has his mother's eyes, and that's very important in a future book". That future book was Deathly Hallows. In Snape's death scene in that novel, after having passed on his memories to Harry, he whispers to Harry: "Look... at... me..." In one of Snape's memories, it is revealed that Dumbledore persuades Snape to protect Harry after Lily's death by mentioning the fact that he has "precisely" the same eyes as his mother. His last words to Harry were simply a desire to see Lily's eyes before he died.

Harry's dead parents are seen five times in the books (not counting their appearances in numerous magical photographs). Firstly in Philosopher's Stone, Harry sees James and Lily in the Mirror of Erised. Secondly during Harry's struggle with Voldemort in Goblet of Fire, they appear momentarily, along with other victims killed by Voldemort's wand. They appear in Snape's memories in both Order of the Phoenix and Deathly Hallows, and finally in Deathly Hallows when Harry makes his self-sacrificing walk into the Forbidden Forest, determined to let Voldemort kill him without offering resistance, Harry's parents walk at his side and Lily tells him how proud they are of him.

In an interview conducted by Daniel Radcliffe, Rowling revealed that Lily Potter's maiden name, Evans, was based on the real name of the author George Eliot, Mary Anne Evans.

Lily is portrayed by Geraldine Somerville as an adult in the film series, and by Susie Shinner as a teenager and Ellie Darcey-Alden as a child.

Kingsley Shacklebolt
Kingsley Shacklebolt is a senior Auror who acts as informer for the Order within the Ministry of Magic. He is first introduced in Harry Potter and the Order of the Phoenix, when he volunteers to be one of the members of the Advance Guard that escorted Harry from the Dursleys' home to Number 12, Grimmauld Place. Kingsley is in charge of the search for Sirius in the Ministry; however, knowing Sirius is innocent, he is supplying the Ministry false information that Sirius is in Tibet. He is present in the scene of the fifth book when Harry is confronted about Dumbledore's Army, after Marietta Edgecombe betrays it to Dolores Umbridge. Kingsley swiftly modifies Marietta's memory, but to avoid suspicion from the Ministry, Dumbledore is forced to hex him too as he flees.

Kingsley takes part in the battle at the Department of Mysteries and appears to be very skilled at duelling as he is seen fighting two Death Eaters at once. However, after Sirius is killed, he continues the duel with Bellatrix Lestrange, during which Kingsley is hit by a spell that causes a "loud bang" and he hits the ground "yelling in pain". In Harry Potter and the Half-Blood Prince, the new Minister for Magic, Rufus Scrimgeour, appoints Kingsley to the Muggle Prime Minister's office, posing as a secretary, but being the Prime Minister's guard.

It is revealed in Harry Potter and the Deathly Hallows that Kingsley is one of the few wizards that the Dursleys seem to like, due to his skill at blending in well with Muggles and his calm, collected demeanour. In that book, Kingsley first appears with other Order members to move Harry from the Dursleys' home to safety in the Burrow. Later in the book, he manages to send a timely warning to Bill and Fleur's wedding using his Patronus, a lynx, when Voldemort overthrows the Ministry of Magic, giving the guests a chance to escape. He continues to guard the Prime Minister but is eventually forced to flee. He later is heard preaching equal rights for Muggles and Wizards on the pirate radio programme "Potterwatch" under the pseudonym "Royal". In the Battle of Hogwarts, he is first seen organising those who remained to fight. He is later seen dueling an unnamed Death Eater, and ends up duelling Voldemort himself, alongside Minerva McGonagall and Horace Slughorn, but after Bellatrix's death, Voldemort's anger erupts; Kingsley and the two others are defeated (although not killed). Kingsley is appointed temporary Minister for Magic following the death of Voldemort and the deposition of Voldemort's puppet ruler, Pius Thicknesse. However, it was later revealed by Rowling in an interview that Kingsley did become the new Minister permanently, revolutionising the Ministry itself.

George Harris appeared as Kingsley in the movies Order of the Phoenix and both parts of Deathly Hallows.

Nymphadora Tonks 

Nymphadora Tonks is a Metamorphmagus and an Auror. Her name means "Gift of the Nymphs". She despises her first name and prefers to be called by her surname alone. She is still referred to as "Tonks" by her peers even after her marriage.

She is described as having "a pale heart-shaped face, dark twinkling eyes", and is usually depicted with different hair colours, which she can change at will. Tonks is seen to be notoriously clumsy and unskilled at household spells. Nymphadora is the only daughter of Ted and Andromeda Tonks, the latter being sister to Bellatrix Lestrange and Narcissa Malfoy; Nymphadora is therefore Draco Malfoy's first cousin yet she never addresses him as family, alluding to him simply as "the Malfoy boy". Tonks is sorted into Hufflepuff, and graduates from Hogwarts one year before Harry enters, after which she begins three years of Auror training; under Moody's tutelage, she qualifies as an Auror one year before her first appearance in Order of the Phoenix.

Tonks and Kingsley act as spies for the Order in the Ministry. She helps to escort Harry first from the Dursleys' house to Order headquarters, and later to the Hogwarts Express. Tonks later fights the Death Eaters at the Department of Mysteries, in which she is injured by Bellatrix, and has to be taken to St Mungo's. During Half-Blood Prince, Tonks is stationed at Hogsmeade and assigned to guard Hogwarts. Harry observes she is constantly depressed and rarely smiles. Also, he sees her hair is a mousy brown instead of its usual bright bubble-gum pink. After Dumbledore's death, it is revealed that Tonks has fallen in love with Lupin, and her Patronus has, as a result, changed to the form of a wolf. Lupin is reluctant to return her affections arguing that he is "too old, too poor, and too dangerous" for her. Because of this, she falls into a depression that disturbs her magical abilities including her ability to change her appearance at will.

However, early in Deathly Hallows, Tonks announces that she has recently married Remus Lupin. Tonks accompanies twelve Order members to take Harry from the Dursleys' home to The Burrow. She flies with Ron, who impersonates Harry using Polyjuice Potion to throw the Death Eaters off the real Harry's trail. During the aerial battle, Tonks fights Bellatrix again and injures Bellatrix's husband, Rodolphus. Later in the book, Remus reveals Tonks is pregnant. He leaves her for a brief period, believing that he, through their marriage, has caused her to become an outcast and their unborn child would be better off without him, but changes his mind and returns to her side after a heated argument with Harry. In April of the seventh book, Tonks gives birth to Teddy Remus Lupin, named after her father and husband. Towards the end of the book, Tonks and Lupin join the Battle of Hogwarts. During the battle, Tonks is killed by Bellatrix, and Lupin is killed by Antonin Dolohov, leaving Teddy an orphan to be raised by his maternal grandmother, Andromeda. In an interview shortly after the release of Deathly Hallows, Rowling confessed that she had originally intended for Tonks and Lupin to survive the series ending, but felt that she had to kill them after she spared Arthur Weasley in Order of the Phoenix.

Natalia Tena played Tonks in the film versions of Order of the Phoenix, Half-Blood Prince and both parts of Deathly Hallows.

Arthur Weasley
Arthur Weasley is the patriarch of the Weasleys, a family of wizards who are considered "blood traitors" by Death Eaters for their interest in the Muggle world. He is married to Molly Weasley, with whom he has seven children, including Ron, Harry's best friend. During his time at Hogwarts, Arthur belonged to the house of Gryffindor. Arthur is described as being tall and thin, and as having a receding hairline and horn-rimmed glasses. An affable, light-hearted man, he tends not to be the authority figure in the family; his wife Molly handles that area. Arthur works for the Ministry of Magic, initially in the Misuse of Muggle Artefacts Office. He is obsessed with learning about Muggle customs and inventions and owns a large collection of mostly Muggle used items. His department lacks funding, and his salary is only just able to provide for a vast family, leaving his family finances precarious.

Mr. Weasley first appears in Harry Potter and the Chamber of Secrets, when Harry stays with the Weasley family at The Burrow during the summer before the first term of Hogwarts begins. In this book, Lucius Malfoy tries to discredit Arthur when Harry and Ron are seen flying his enchanted car and by placing Tom Riddle's diary in Ginny's cauldron so that she can open the Chamber of Secrets and take the blame for the attacks on Muggle-borns. However, Lucius fails to fulfil his objective and the diary is destroyed.

At the start of Harry Potter and the Prisoner of Azkaban, Arthur wins a large cash prize in a sweepstake and uses it to take the whole family on a holiday to Egypt. After they return, Arthur thinks that Harry should know (what Arthur then believes to be) the truth about Sirius Black. In Harry Potter and the Goblet of Fire, it seems that Arthur does not fully believe the stories of Harry's abuse at the hands of the Dursleys until he witnesses what they think about Harry and the Wizarding World and is stunned to see them so eager to say goodbye to him, before taking him to the Quidditch World Cup. At the beginning of Harry Potter and the Order of the Phoenix, Mr. Weasley is a member of the Order and accompanies Harry to his visit to the Ministry. During one of his shifts in the Ministry guarding Sybill Trelawney's prophecy, Voldemort's pet snake Nagini attacks him. Harry, who is mentally connected with Voldemort, manages to see this in a vision and is able to warn the Hogwarts authorities. Arthur is subsequently saved just in time and sent to St Mungo's Hospital for Magical Maladies and Injuries, where he fully recovers. Rowling has revealed that in the original draft for Order of the Phoenix she planned to kill Arthur. She changed her mind, however, saying that she could not kill Arthur as he is one of the few good fathers in the series. However, as she "wanted to kill parents", she spared Arthur's life in exchange for Lupin's and Tonks'. In Harry Potter and the Half-Blood Prince, Arthur has been promoted to Head of the Office for the Detection and Confiscation of Counterfeit Defensive Spells and Protective Objects.

In Harry Potter and the Deathly Hallows, Arthur is part of the group that moves Harry from Privet Drive for the last time, accompanied by his son Fred who acted as one of the seven Potters. Arthur continues to work in the Ministry but all his movements are tracked. When it is discovered that Ron is travelling with Harry and not sick at home, the Weasleys are forced to hide. Arthur reappears in the Battle of Hogwarts, in which he loses his son Fred, and is joined by Percy Weasley in defeating Pius Thicknesse.

Arthur Weasley appears in every film except the first and is portrayed by Mark Williams.

Bill Weasley
William Arthur "Bill" Weasley  is the eldest born son of Arthur and Molly Weasley. He is described to be "hard-working" and "down-to-earth", but possesses a fondness for "a bit of adventure, a bit of glamour". During his time at Hogwarts, Bill becomes both a prefect and Head Boy, with 12 OWLs to his credit. Later, he works for Gringotts Bank in Egypt as a Curse-Breaker.

He makes his first full appearance in Harry Potter and the Goblet of Fire, where he is described as being a good-looking young man, sporting long red hair tied back in a ponytail and a single fang earring. When he and Mrs Weasley pay a visit to Hogwarts during the Triwizard Tournament, Fleur eyes him with "great interest". Bill returns to Britain to work with the Order in Harry Potter and the Order of the Phoenix. He meets Fleur at Gringotts head office in London where she is employed at the time, giving her lessons to improve her English. After a year-long relationship, the couple gets engaged, and Bill brings his fiancée home to get to know his family, who disapprove of her.

Bill fights against the Death Eaters' attack at Hogwarts near the end of Harry Potter and the Half-Blood Prince, where he is attacked by werewolf Fenrir Greyback, who disfigures him. As Greyback was in human form at the time of the attack, Bill suffers only partial lycanthropy contamination—permanent scarring of his face, and an acquired liking for very rare beef. Fleur, who regards his wounds as a proud sign of his bravery, is adamant that their wedding proceed as scheduled, impressing Bill's family about the match's strength. In Harry Potter and the Deathly Hallows Fleur and Bill take part in getting Harry escorted safely from the Dursleys' house, and they witness Mad-Eye Moody being killed by Voldemort himself, which they announce upon their return to the Burrow. The couple have their wedding there and later provide a safe haven for the trio and several others in their home, Shell Cottage. Both Bill and Fleur were combatants during the Battle of Hogwarts, and both survived the battle. Bill and Fleur later have three children: Victoire, Dominique and Louis.

Richard Fish appeared as Bill briefly in the film adaptation of Harry Potter and the Prisoner of Azkaban. Domhnall Gleeson, the son of actor Brendan Gleeson (Alastor Moody in the series), plays Bill Weasley in Harry Potter and the Deathly Hallows and the roller coaster ride Harry Potter and the Escape from Gringotts at The Wizarding World of Harry Potter – Diagon Alley in Universal Studios Florida.

Charlie Weasley
Charlie  Weasley is the second son of Arthur and Molly Weasley and is described as having a build like that of his brothers Fred and George: shorter and stockier than Bill, Percy and Ron. He has a broad, good-natured face, which is slightly weather-beaten and very freckly. His arms are muscly, and one of them has a long shiny burn. While at Hogwarts, he was a prefect, a Quidditch Captain, and a legendary Seeker for the Gryffindor Quidditch team. His skills as a Seeker were so good that it was said, "He could have been capped for England if he hadn't gone off chasing dragons."

After school, Charlie chooses to go to Romania to work with dragons as a Dragon Keeper. At Harry, Ron and Hermione's request, he takes Hagrid's baby dragon, Norbert, an illegally hatched Norwegian Ridgeback, into his care in Harry's first year, and he is part of a team of Dragon Keepers that brings four dragons of different breeds to Hogwarts in Harry Potter and the Goblet of Fire for the First Task of the Triwizard Tournament.

During the second rise of Voldemort, Charlie's task in the Order is to try to rally support abroad. Charlie returns to the Burrow in Harry Potter and the Deathly Hallows to participate in his brother Bill's wedding as best man. He enters the later part of the Battle of Hogwarts, alongside Horace Slughorn, at the head of reinforcements for the defenders, and survives the battle without serious injury. He does not marry or have children, since he "preferred dragons to women", according to Rowling.

Alex Crockford appeared briefly as Charlie in the film adaptation of Prisoner of Azkaban.

Molly Weasley
Molly Weasley (née Prewett) is the wife of Arthur Weasley and the matriarch of the Weasley family. She is the mother of seven children, including Ron Weasley, who becomes Harry Potter's best friend. Molly is born into the pure-blood Prewett family, being the sister of Gideon and Fabian Prewett. The character is first introduced in Harry Potter and the Philosopher's Stone, when she kindly tells Harry how to cross the barrier through to Platform Nine and Three-Quarters. In Harry Potter and the Chamber of Secrets, she is furious with Fred, George, and Ron after she discovers that they flew their parents' enchanted car to rescue Harry from his aunt and uncle who had imprisoned him in his room. At the beginning of the school year, Molly sends Ron a Howler, screaming at him in anger that he and Harry flew the family car again, this time to Hogwarts. In Harry Potter and the Prisoner of Azkaban, the Weasleys win the Daily Prophet draw and use the gold on a trip to Egypt to visit Bill. They return to Britain and stay at The Leaky Cauldron with Harry and Hermione. Harry overhears Mr and Mrs Weasley arguing one night about telling Harry the truth about the supposed connection between Sirius Black and Harry; Arthur feels Harry should know the truth but Molly, feeling the truth would terrify him, assures him Harry will be perfectly safe at Hogwarts with Dumbledore's protection, and orders Percy Weasley to keep an eye on Harry at the school.

When Harry arrives at the Burrow in Harry Potter and the Goblet of Fire, Molly finds out about Fred and George's experimentation with dangerous sweets they were manufacturing and tells them off before leaving for the Quidditch World Cup; however, after the Dark Mark appears over the sky at the World Cup campsite, Molly is upset for yelling at Fred and George, worried that something might have happened to them after she treated them so horribly. Towards the climax of that book, Molly and Bill arrive at Hogwarts to see the Third Task of the Triwizard Tournament, acting as family guests to Harry. After the return of Voldemort, Dumbledore asks Molly and Bill to join the Order and fight in the impending Second War. Molly comforts Harry and, for the first time in his life, he has someone to be there for him, like a mother.

Molly and the Weasleys are staying at the Order headquarters, Number Twelve, Grimmauld Place, in Harry Potter and the Order of the Phoenix, where she and Sirius fight over how much to tell Harry about the Order's operations. Days later, Molly is found in the drawing room, with a boggart that transforms into her dead family members and Harry, and confesses her nightmares of losing more family members to Voldemort and the Death Eaters. At the beginning of Harry Potter and the Half-Blood Prince, Molly clashes with Bill's fiancée, Fleur Delacour; however, at the end of the novel, when Molly rushes to Hogwarts with her husband and Fleur to tend to her son Bill, who had been ferociously attacked by Fenrir Greyback, Fleur is greatly offended when Molly jumps to the conclusion she will break up with Bill due to his scarring, letting her know in no uncertain terms that his scars are a reminder of the courage that Bill displayed. Fleur and Molly unexpectedly hug and begin to see each other in a much more positive light.

At the beginning of Harry Potter and the Deathly Hallows, Molly and Arthur offer the Burrow as Order headquarters when Grimmauld Place is no longer safe. She feels immensely uncomfortable with the trio's decision to drop out of Hogwarts and initially attempts to dissuade them from doing so. As the novel progresses, the family is forced to head for safety at Auntie Muriel's home. At the end of the book, Molly and her entire family fight in the Battle of Hogwarts. She is devastated by the death of her son Fred and is pushed to the edge when Bellatrix Lestrange almost strikes Ginny with the Killing Curse. Enraged, she engages Bellatrix in an intense duel, killing her with a curse that hits her in the chest. Rowling has stated that the reason she had Molly kill Bellatrix was to show Molly's great powers as a witch and to provide a contrast between Molly's consumption with "maternal love" and Bellatrix's with "obsessive love".

The Chicago Tribunes Courtney Crowder lists Molly Weasley as her favourite literary mother, describing her as the "original Mama Grizzly", citing her many touching moments with Harry as well as the final book in the series, where "her feelings jumped off the page" as testament to her strong personality. Crowder summarises Molly's character as "levelheaded, yet willing to fight, intelligent, welcoming, and above all, extremely loving". In a Mother's Day article Molly was also voted the third greatest celebrity mother by The Flowers and Plants association who see the character as "formidable, practical, creative and resourceful". Bob Smietana of Christianity Today links Molly's defence of Ginny in the final book into a wider theme in the series about the strength of parental love, which he feels to carry considerable emotional weight. Empire listed Molly Weasley 24th on their Top 30 Harry Potter characters. Novelist Stephen King notes that when Molly called Bellatrix a "bitch" after she sees the Death Eater trying to kill Ginny, it was "the most shocking bitch in recent fiction", and that it shows how adult the books had become.

Julie Walters portrays Molly Weasley in every film except Goblet of Fire, in which her role in the novel is cut out. In 2003, BBC voted her portrayal of Molly as the second-"best screen mother", behind Julia Roberts as Erin Brockovich.

References

External links

The Harry Potter Lexicon item on the Order of the Phoenix

Harry Potter organisations
Fictional secret societies
Fictional revolutionary organizations